Bolostromus is a genus of wafer trapdoor spiders that was first described by Anton Ausserer in 1875.

Species
 it contains nine species:
Bolostromus fauna (Simon, 1889) – Venezuela
Bolostromus gaujoni (Simon, 1889) – Ecuador
Bolostromus holguinensis Rudloff, 1996 – Cuba
Bolostromus insularis (Simon, 1892) – St. Vincent
Bolostromus panamanus (Petrunkevitch, 1925) – Panama
Bolostromus pulchripes (Simon, 1889) – Venezuela
Bolostromus riveti Simon, 1903 – Ecuador
Bolostromus suspectus O. Pickard-Cambridge, 1911 – Uganda
Bolostromus venustus Ausserer, 1875 (type) – Colombia

References

Cyrtaucheniidae
Mygalomorphae genera
Taxa named by Anton Ausserer